Bull Lake is an unincorporated community and census-designated place (CDP) in Lincoln County, Montana, United States. It is in the southwestern part of the county, surrounding the lake of the same name. Montana Highway 56 runs along the east side of the lake, leading north  to Troy in the Kootenay River valley and south  to Montana Highway 200 in the Clark Fork valley.

Bull Lake was first listed as a CDP prior to the 2020 census.

Demographics

References 

Census-designated places in Lincoln County, Montana
Census-designated places in Montana